Gone Are the Dayes is a 1984 American made-for-television crime comedy film produced by Walt Disney Productions directed by Gabrielle Beaumont and starring Harvey Korman, Susan Anspach and Robert Hogan. It originally aired May 6, 1984 on the Disney Channel.

Plot
When the Daye family goes out for food at a Japanese restaurant, they witness a gangland slaying. A federal agent, named Mitchell, persuades the parents to be witnesses in the trial against the gang boss who ordered the hit.

Cast 
 Harvey Korman as Charlie Mitchell
 Susan Anspach as Phyllis Daye
 Robert Hogan as Harry Daye
 Nate Esformes as Papa Delgado
 Joe Cortese as Frank Delgado
 Victoria Carroll as Gilda Fleming
 Bibi Besch as District Attorney
 Joshua Bryant as Fred Cooper
 Mary Jo Catlett as Marge
 David Glasser as Ricky Daye
 Sharee Gregory as Melissa Daye
 Justin Lord as Don
 Steven Hirsch as Joe
 Elizabeth Savage as Nurse #1
 Ted Gehring as Cook

External links
 
 

1984 television films
1984 films
1980s crime comedy films
American crime comedy films
Films directed by Gabrielle Beaumont
Disney Channel original films
1984 comedy films
1980s English-language films
1980s American films